The 1973–74 Divizia A was the fifty-sixth season of Divizia A, the top-level football league of Romania.

Teams

League table

Results

Top goalscorers

Champion squad

See also 
 1973–74 Divizia B
 1973–74 Divizia C

References

Liga I seasons
Romania
1973–74 in Romanian football